Milo Henry Allison (October 16, 1890 – June 18, 1957) was a professional baseball player from 1913 to 1917. As an outfielder, he played for the Chicago Cubs and Cleveland Indians. His career batting average was .217, with no extra-base hits in the major leagues.

References 
 Milo Allison at Baseball-Reference

1890 births
1957 deaths
Baseball players from Michigan
Chicago Cubs players
Cleveland Indians players
Major League Baseball outfielders
Cadillac Chiefs players
Memphis Chickasaws players
New Orleans Pelicans (baseball) players
Burials in Wisconsin
People from Elk Rapids, Michigan